Potassium channel subfamily K member 9 is a protein that in humans is encoded by the KCNK9 gene.

This gene encodes K2P9.1, one of the members of the superfamily of potassium channel proteins containing two pore-forming P domains. This open channel is highly expressed in the cerebellum. It is inhibited by extracellular acidification and arachidonic acid, and strongly inhibited by phorbol 12-myristate 13-acetate.  Phorbol 12-myristate 13-acetate is also known as 12-O-tetradecanoylphorbol-13-acetate (TPA). TASK channels are additionally inhibited by hormones and transmitters that signal through GqPCRs. The resulting cellular depolarization is thought to regulate processes such as motor control and aldosterone secretion. Despite early controversy about the exact mechanism underlying this inhibition, the current view is that Diacyl-glycerol, produced by the breakdown of Phosphatidylinositol-4,5-bis-phosphate by Phospholipase Cβ causes channel closure.

Expression

The KCNK9 gene is expressed as an ion channel more commonly known as TASK 3. This channel has a varied pattern of expression. TASK 3 is coexpressed with TASK 1 (KCNK3) in the cerebellar granule cells, locus coeruleus, motor neurons, pontine nuclei, some cells in the neocortex, habenula, olfactory bulb granule cells, and cells in the external plexiform layer of the olfactory bulb. TASK-3 channels are also expressed in the hippocampus; both on pyramidal cells and interneurons. It is thought that these channels may form heterodimers where their expressions co-localise.

Function

Mice in which the TASK-3 gene has been deleted have reduced sensitivity to inhalation anaesthetics, exaggerated nocturnal activity and cognitive deficits as well as significantly increased appetite and weight gain. A role for TASK-3 channels in neuronal network oscillations has also been described: TASK-3 knockout mice lack the atropine-sensitive halothane-induced theta oscillation (4–7 Hz) from the hippocampus and are unable to maintain theta oscillations during rapid eye movement (REM) sleep.

Interactive pathway map

See also
 Tandem pore domain potassium channel

References

Further reading

External links 
 
 

Ion channels